Emmet E. "Tripp" Tracy III (born December 20, 1973) is a retired American professional ice hockey goaltender and the current television and radio color commentator for the Carolina Hurricanes.

Playing career
Tracy was a goalie for Harvard University for four years. In his first two seasons, he shared goaltending minutes with classmate Aaron Israel; he became the lone starter in 1994, his junior year, when Israel left to join the Philadelphia Flyers' farm system.

Tracy was drafted in the 9th round (218th overall) by the Flyers in the 1993 NHL Entry Draft. After he graduated from Harvard in 1996, he signed a free agent contract with the Hartford Whalers; he played two seasons in the franchise’s farm system, in the ECHL and AHL.

Broadcast career
After retiring from playing hockey in 1998, Tracy worked briefly for CNN before rejoining the Hurricanes organization as an announcer for the 1998-1999 season. He has been with the Hurricanes broadcast team ever since.

On April 26, 2022, Tracy made several strange posts on Twitter referencing a personal struggle with alcohol while misspelling several words in the tweets. On April 27, 2022, Carolina Hurricanes President and General Manager Don Waddell said Tracy would miss the remainder of the season and playoffs to address a "personal matter"; Shane Willis, the Hurricanes Director of Youth Hockey and Community Outreach, stepped into Tracy's role alongside play-by-play announcer Mike Maniscalco. Tracy would later come out as a recovering alcoholic and discuss his struggles with sobriety. Tracy returned to the broadcast booth for start of the 2022–23 NHL season.

Awards and honors

References

External links

1973 births
Living people
American men's ice hockey goaltenders
Beast of New Haven players
Carolina Hurricanes announcers
Harvard Crimson men's ice hockey players
National Hockey League broadcasters
Sportspeople from Detroit
Philadelphia Flyers draft picks
Richmond Renegades players
Springfield Falcons players
Ice hockey people from Michigan
Ice hockey people from Detroit